Khatereh (also Khatira) is an Iranian feminine given name meaning "memory" or "remembrance". Notable people with the name include:

 Khatereh Asadi (born 1983), Iranian actress
 Khatira Bashirli (born 1958), Azerbaijani academic
 Khatereh Parvaneh (1930-2008), Iranian singer

See also 
 Khatereh, Dowreh, a village in Iran

References 

Iranian feminine given names